Poslední mohykán is a Czech comedy film directed by Vladimír Slavínský. It was released in 1947.

External links
 

1947 films
1947 comedy films
Czechoslovak black-and-white films
Czechoslovak comedy films
1940s Czech films